The 2005 William Hill Greyhound Derby took place in June and July with the final being held on 2 July 2005 at Wimbledon Stadium. The winner Westmead Hawk received the title and £100,000 in prize money.

Final result 
At Wimbledon (over 480 metres):

Distances 
1¾, 3, ½, ¾, short head (lengths)
The distances between the greyhounds are in finishing order and shown in lengths. One length is equal to 0.08 of one second.

Final Report
The 2005 title was won by Westmead Hawk. It was the second year in a row that trainer Nick Savva won. After coming last out of the traps and having found trouble in the race, the winner was at the back of the field for most of the final. However, he ran on strong and took the lead just before the finishing line, providing a great climax to the race.

Quarter finals

Semi finals

Competition report
The leading English hopes were the Charlie Lister range including Robbie De Niro, Bell Devotion and Laurels champion  Ningbo Jack. The Carly Philpott duo of Ballymac Pires and Ballymac Kewell were also considered dangers. Ireland sent over an impressive group led by the Frazer Black's Irish Derby finalists Droopys Marco (also the Scottish Greyhound Derby champion) and Droopys Maldini. The Seamus Graham pair Blue Majestic and Mineola Farloe lined up alongside the McKenna team now under control of Ger McKenna's son Owen, which included Superb Pass, Irish Derby finalist Geldrops Touch, Agassis Ace and Boherduff Light.

The 2004 Greyhound of the Year Fire Height Dan won his first round heat on 2 June but it was found that he had injured a pisiform bone. His connections announced that he would be retired. Droopys Leroy went fastest on the night, winning in 28.59. On the third night of heats Droopys Marco (28.60), Ballymac Pires (28.48) and Droopys Maldini (28.49) all impressed.

The second round began on 10 June with surprise eliminations including Agassis Ace, Hee Haws Barney and Ballymac Pires. The following night Westmead Hawk won again in a heat that contained Droopys Maldini, Droopys Marco impressed again going fastest in 28.58.

Droopys Leroy was eliminated in the first heat of round three which was won by Count Gelignite. The next heats went to Toms View, Velvet Rebel, Geldrops Touch and Ballymac Niloc before Droopys Marco held on to defeat the strong finishing Westmead Hawk in a sensational heat. Blue Majestic and Lenson Thierry completed the night's winners. Droopys Maldini and Romeo Paddy were high profile casualties.

Ningbo Jack won the first quarter final and Blue Majestic and January Tiger won heats 3 and 4 respectively but heat 2 was another meeting between Droopys Marco and Westmead Hawk. However this time Hawk caught Droopys Marco on the run-in to claim a revenge victory.

Westmead Hawk became a strong favourite when Droopys Marco failed to progress to the final in the first semi final, he found trouble in a race won by Ningo Jack and finished last. Blue Majestic and Geldrops Touch claimed the other two qualifying places. In the second semi final Westmead Hawk also found trouble but made his way through the field to finish second behind Mineola Farloe with outsider Blonde Mac taking third place.

See also 
2005 UK & Ireland Greyhound Racing Year

References

 Results
 Results and video of the race

External links 
 British Greyhound Racing Board
 Greyhound Data

Greyhound Derby
English Greyhound Derby
English Greyhound Derby
English Greyhound Derby
English Greyhound Derby